McKim Creek may refer to:

McKim Creek (Idaho), a tributary of the Salmon River (Idaho)
McKim Creek (West Virginia), a tributary of Middle Island Creek